"21 Seconds" is a song by UK garage crew So Solid Crew. Released as the second single from their debut album, They Don't Know (2001), it was the first of five consecutive top-20 hit singles for the group, topping the UK Singles Chart in August 2001, and peaked just outside the top 40 in the Netherlands. In the United Kingdom, it sold 118,135 units in its first week.

In September 2019, NME included the song in their "25 essential UK garage anthems" list.

Composition and production
The song uses fairly stripped back production, utilising a 2-step rhythm which was common in UK garage at the time. Lisa Maffia's young daughter, Chelsea, can be heard at the beginning of the track, saying "Ha, ha, ha, whatcha laughin at?"

The song title alludes to the approximate 21 seconds that each of the band members is given to perform their rap. 21 seconds is arrived at as the song's tempo is approximately 140BPM and each rapper has 12 bars of 4 beats (48 beats at 140BPM, when worked out to the nearest integer, rounds to 21 seconds). Megaman said the crew created the track after their label told them to make a track lasting three and a half minutes. He said "so we worked out that with at least 10 or 11 members, that's eight bars each – 21 seconds. It was a simple calculation." Their label manager Shabs Jobanputra said "they literally took a calculator and divided the time by the number of MCs."

Music video

The music video received the award for British Video of the Year at the 2002 Brit Awards.

Commercial performance
"21 Seconds" was the first UK garage track to reach number one on the UK Official Chart, selling 118,135 copies in its opening week and becoming 2001's 19th best-selling single. Its total sales reached 423,000.

Critical reception
In a 2002 review, Pete Paphides in The Guardian said the track was "a brilliant idea" but that "not a single member of the collective uses their time to say anything remotely insightful." In a 2020 retrospective review of the single, The Quietus said the track "managed to capture the excitement of clubs and pirate radio, with MCs frantically passing the mic as they try to outdo each other in lyrical prowess, creative aggression bubbling beneath the surface." The same year, The Guardian placed the song at number 48 on their list of "The 100 Greatest UK No 1 Singles".

Track listings

UK CD single
 "21 Seconds" (original So Solid version)
 "21 Seconds" (12-inch version)
 "21 Seconds" (DJ Swiss & Dan Da Man remix vocal)
 "21 Seconds" (video)

UK 12-inch single
A1. "21 Seconds" (original So Solid version)
A2. "21 Seconds" (12-inch version)
B1. "21 Seconds" (DJ Swiss & Dan Da Man remix vocal)
B2. "21 Seconds" (DJ Swiss & Dan Da Man remix instrumental)

UK cassette single
 "21 Seconds" (original So Solid version)
 "21 Seconds" (12-inch version)

European CD1
 "21 Seconds" (Seven Gemini remix)
 "21 Seconds" (radio edit) – 3:54

European CD2
 "21 Seconds" (Seven Gemini remix)
 "21 Seconds" (Seven Gemini remix instrumental)
 "21 Seconds" (radio edit)
 "21 Seconds" (Seven Gemini remix video)

Charts

Weekly charts

Year-end charts

Certifications

Release history

Other versions
Romeo reworked "21 Seconds" for car insurance firm Confused.com in 2013. The same year, Preditah reworked the track.

On 6 September 2019 So Solid Crew went to the Red Bull Music Studios, London, and remixed "21 Seconds" with Toddla T. They were joined by D Double E, Ms Banks and DJ Q as they added new verses.

In 2019, DJ Spoony together with Katie Chatburn and the Ignition Orchestra featuring So Solid Crew recorded an orchestral version of the song for the UK garage covers album Garage Classical.

Manchester rapper Aitch covered the track in 2020.

References

2001 songs
2001 singles
So Solid Crew songs
Relentless Records singles
UK Singles Chart number-one singles